Knappton is an extinct town in Pacific County, in the U.S. state of Washington. The GNIS classifies it as a populated place. It is located not far from the mouth of the Columbia, a few miles east of the Astoria-Megler Bridge. 

A post office called Knappton was established in 1871, and remained in operation until 1943. The community was named after J. B. Knapp, the proprietor of a local sawmill.

References

Ghost towns in Washington (state)
Geography of Pacific County, Washington